Singin' with the Big Bands is a 1994 album by Barry Manilow.

The album was Manilow's first to reach gold since Because It's Christmas (1990).

Track listing
"Singin' With The Big Bands" (Barry Manilow, Bruce Sussman) 2:28
"Sentimental Journey" - Featuring Les Brown and his Band of Renown (Bud Green, Les Brown, Ben Homer) 3:19
"And the Angels Sing" (Johnny Mercer, Ziggy Elman) 3:04
"Green Eyes" - Featuring The Jimmy Dorsey Orchestra with Rosemary Clooney (Eddie Rivera, Eddie Woods, Nilo Menendez) 3:19 (with Rosemary Clooney)
"I Should Care" (Sammy Cahn, Axel Stordahl, Paul Weston) 3:02
"Don't Get Around Much Anymore" - Featuring The Duke Ellington Orchestra (Duke Ellington, Bob Russell) 2:58
"I Can't Get Started" (Vernon Duke, Ira Gershwin) 4:29
"Chattanooga Choo Choo" (Mack Gordon, Harry Warren) 3:24
"Moonlight Serenade" (Glenn Miller, Mitchell Parish) 4:50
"On the Sunny Side of the Street" - Featuring the Tommy Dorsey Orchestra (Dorothy Fields, Jimmy McHugh) 3:26
"All or Nothing at All" - Featuring The Harry James Orchestra (Arthur Altman, Jack Lawrence) 3:02
"I'll Never Smile Again" - Featuring The Tommy Dorsey Orchestra (Ruth Lowe) 3:08
"I'm Getting Sentimental over You" (George Bassman, Ned Washington) 3:27
"Don't Sit Under the Apple Tree (With Anyone Else but Me)" - Featuring The Glenn Miller Orchestra with Debra Byrd (Lew Brown, Sam H. Stept, Charles Tobias) 2:52
"(I'll Be with You in) Apple Blossom Time" (Neville Fleeson, Albert Von Tilzer) 2:31
"Where Does The Time Go?" (Barry Manilow, Bruce Sussman) 3:10

Charts

Weekly charts

Year-end charts

References

External links 

 [ Billboard]

Barry Manilow albums
1994 albums
1994 in music
Arista Records albums
Covers albums
Traditional pop albums